The following is a list of futures contracts on physically traded commodities'''.

Agricultural

Grains, food and fiber
Symbol from

Livestock and meat

Energy

Forest products

Metals

Industrial

Precious

Other

List of largest global commodities trading companies

 Vitol
 Glencore International AG
 Trafigura 
 Cargill 
 Salam Investment 
 Archer Daniels Midland 
 Gunvor (company) 
 Beddu-Trading
 Mercuria Energy Group 
 Noble Group 
 Louis Dreyfus Group 
 Bunge Limited
 Wilmar International 
 Olam International
 Cannon Trading Company
 Prime Trading, LLC
 Knarr Bank

Commodity exchanges and regulators 
Chicago Board of Trade
Chicago Mercantile Exchange
Commodity Futures Trading Commission
Dubai Mercantile Exchange
Euronext
ICE Futures Abu Dhabi
London International Financial Futures and Options Exchange
NASDAQ OMX Commodities
National Futures Association
New York Mercantile Exchange
Kansas City Board of Trade
New York Board of Trade
LedgerX
Dalian Commodity Exchange

References 

 
 
 List of Commodity Delivery Dates on Wikinvest
 

Commodities used as an investment
Commodity markets
Commodities